The Sheriff of Kintyre was historically the royal official responsible for enforcing law and order in Kintyre, Scotland and bringing criminals to justice. The sheriffdom was created in 1293 by King John of Scotland in an effort to maintain peace in the western reaches of his realm. At some point before 1481, it was superseded by, or became, Tarbertshire.

Sheriffs of Kintyre 

James Stewart, High Steward of Scotland 1293-??

Citations and References
Citations

Reference

Sheriff courts
Kintyre
Sheriff
1293 establishments in Scotland